Stranska Vas is a settlement in the foothills of the Gorjanci range, south of Novo Mesto in southeastern Slovenia. The area is part of the traditional region of Lower Carniola and is now included in the Southeast Slovenia Statistical Region.

The local church, built on the southern outskirts of the village, is dedicated to Saint Nicholas and belongs to the Parish of Novo Mesto–Šmihel. It was a medieval building that was extensively restyled in the Baroque style in the 17th and 18th centuries with only parts of the nave remaining of the original building.

References

External links
Stranska Vas on Geopedia

Populated places in the City Municipality of Novo Mesto